Tavakkoli or Tavakoli (Persian: توكلي or توکلی) is a Persian surname. Notable people with the surname include:
 
Ahmad Tavakkoli (born 1951), Iranian politician, journalist and anti-corruption activist 
Farhad Tavakoli (born 1989), Iranian futsal player 
Hangi Tavakoli (born 1990), Iranian musician and record producer
Hossein Tavakkoli (born 1978), Iranian weightlifter 
Janet Tavakoli, American finance and investment writer
Majid Tavakoli (born 1986), Iranian student leader, human rights activist and political prisoner
Mohamad Tavakoli-Targhi (born 1957), Iranian-born Canadian scholar, editor, author, professor
Ziaeddin Tavakkoli (1925–2009), Iranian politician and merchant

Arabic-language surnames
Persian-language surnames